Movie Maker (also referred to as Reston Movie Maker) is a computer program published by Reston Publishing Company in 1984 which allows users to author computer-animated visual sequences with audio.  Self-playing movies can be viewed without the Movie Maker software. It was developed by Interactive Picture Systems for the Atari 8-bit family. In 1985 it was re-published by Electronic Arts, including a port to the Commodore 64.

Reception  
David P. Stone reviewed the program for Computer Gaming World, and stated that "if you have a need, or desire, for presenting non-game, impressive animation sequences, then MMTK won't let you down. But, to fully enjoy MMTK you must have the deep personal conviction that 'getting there is half the fun'."

A 1984 Antic review contained an addendum from the editor: "ANTIC was so impressed with Movie Maker that we asked the Interactive Picture Systems people to design an animated greeting card for us, which they did to the delight of all who have seen it." The only major dislike from the reviewer was having to use sounds from the existing, fixed library.

Gregg Williams reviewed the program for Computer Gaming World, and stated that "a so-called animation studio that promises "dazzling animated graphics made easy." The reality is four-color "movies" (four colors--on an Atari?!) so amateurish and primitive that they would impress only a 4-year-old."

References

External links
Review in the Christian Science Monitor
1984 Software Encyclopedia from Electronic Games
Review in Electronic Fun with Computers & Games
Review of Electronic Arts version in Antic
Review in ANALOG Computing
Review in Compute!'s Gazette
Review in Creative Computing
Review in Page 6

1984 software
Animation software
Atari 8-bit family software
Commodore 64 software
Electronic Arts